Ancara is a genus of moths of the family Noctuidae. Species are found in India, Sri Lanka, Andaman Islands, and Borneo.

Description
It is similar to the genus Euplexia, but differs from second joint of palpi reaching vertex of head and long third joint.

Species
 Ancara anaemica Hampson, 1908
 Ancara conformis Warren, 1911
 Ancara consimilis Warren, 1913
 Ancara griseola (Bethune-Baker, 1906)
 Ancara kebea (Bethune-Baker, 1906)
 Ancara obliterans Walker, 1858
 Ancara plaesiosema Turner, 1943
 Ancara replicans Walker, 1858
 Ancara rubriviridis Warren, 1911

References

Acronictinae
Noctuoidea genera